A compound steam engine unit is a type of steam engine where steam is expanded in two or more stages.
A typical arrangement for a compound engine is that the steam is first expanded in a high-pressure (HP) cylinder, then having given up heat and losing pressure, it exhausts directly into one or more larger-volume low-pressure (LP) cylinders. Multiple-expansion engines employ additional cylinders, of progressively lower pressure, to extract further energy from the steam.

Invented in 1781, this technique was first employed on a Cornish beam engine in 1804. Around 1850, compound engines were first introduced into Lancashire textile mills.

Compound systems
There are many compound systems and configurations, but there are two basic types, according to how HP and LP piston strokes are phased and hence whether the HP exhaust is able to pass directly from HP to LP (Woolf compounds) or whether pressure fluctuation necessitates an intermediate "buffer" space in the form of a steam chest or pipe known as a receiver (receiver compounds).

In a single-expansion (or 'simple') steam engine, the high-pressure steam enters the cylinder at boiler pressure through an inlet valve. The steam pressure forces the piston down the cylinder, until the valve shuts (e.g. after 25% of the piston's stroke). After the steam supply is cut off the trapped steam continues to expand, pushing the piston to the end of its stroke, where the exhaust valve opens and expels the partially depleted steam to the atmosphere, or to a condenser. This "cut-off" allows much more work to be extracted, since the expansion of the steam is doing additional work beyond that done by the steam at boiler pressure.

An earlier cut-off increases the expansion ratio, which in principle allows more energy to be extracted and increases efficiency. Ideally, the steam would expand adiabatically, and the temperature would drop corresponding to the volume increase. However, in practice the material of the surrounding cylinder acts as a heat reservoir, cooling the steam in the earlier part of the expansion and heating it in the later part. These irreversible heat flows decrease the efficiency of the process, so that beyond a certain point, further increasing the expansion ratio would actually decrease efficiency, in addition to decreasing the mean effective pressure and thus the power  of the engine.

Compounding engines
A solution to the dilemma was invented in 1804 by British engineer Arthur Woolf, who patented his Woolf high pressure compound engine in 1805. In the compound engine, high-pressure steam from the boiler first expands in a high-pressure (HP) cylinder and then enters one or more subsequent lower pressure (LP) cylinders. The complete expansion of the steam occurs across multiple cylinders and, as there is less expansion in each cylinder, the steam cools less in each cylinder, making higher expansion ratios practical and increasing the efficiency of the engine.

There are other advantages: as the temperature range is smaller, cylinder condensation is reduced. Loss due to condensation is restricted to the LP cylinder. Pressure difference is less in each cylinder so there is less steam leakage at the piston and valves. The turning moment is more uniform, so balancing is easier and a smaller flywheel may be used. Only the smaller HP cylinder needs to be built to withstand the highest pressure, which reduces the overall weight. Similarly, components are subject to less strain, so they can be lighter. The reciprocating parts of the engine are lighter, reducing the engine vibrations. The compound could be started at any point in the cycle, and in the event of mechanical failure the compound could be reset to act as a simple, and thus keep running.

To derive equal work from lower-pressure steam requires a larger cylinder volume as this steam occupies a greater volume. Therefore, the bore, and in rare cases the stroke as well, are increased in low-pressure cylinders, resulting in larger cylinders.

Double-expansion (usually just known as 'compound') engines expand the steam in two stages, but this does not imply that all such engines have two cylinders.  They may have four cylinders working as two LP-HP pairs, or the work of the large LP cylinder can be split across two smaller cylinders, with one HP cylinder exhausting into either LP cylinder, giving a 3-cylinder layout where the cylinder and piston diameter of all three are about the same, making the reciprocating masses easier to balance.

Two-cylinder compounds can be arranged as:
 Cross-compound – the cylinders are side by side
 Tandem compound – the cylinders are end to end, driving a common connecting rod
 Telescopic-compound – the cylinders are one inside the other
 Angle-compound – the cylinders are arranged in a vee (usually at a 90° angle) and drive a common crank.

The adoption of compounding was widespread for stationary industrial units where the need was for increased power at decreasing cost, and almost universal for marine engines after 1880. It was not widely used in railway locomotives where it was often perceived as complicated and unsuitable for the harsh railway operating environment and limited space afforded by the loading gauge (particularly in Britain). Compounding was never common on British railways and not employed at all after 1930, but was used in a limited way in many other countries.

The first successful attempt to fly a heavier-than-air fixed-wing aircraft solely on steam power occurred in 1933, when George and William Besler converted a Travel Air 2000 biplane to fly on a 150 hp angle-compound V-twin steam engine of their own design instead of the usual Curtiss OX-5 inline or radial aviation gasoline engine it would have normally used.

Multiple-expansion engines 

It is a logical extension of the compound engine (described above) to split the expansion into yet more stages to increase efficiency. The result is the multiple-expansion engine. Such engines use either three or four expansion stages and are known as triple- and quadruple-expansion engines respectively. These engines use a series of double-acting cylinders of progressively increasing diameter and/or stroke and hence volume. These cylinders are designed to divide the work into three or four equal portions, one for each expansion stage. The adjacent image shows an animation of a triple-expansion engine. The steam travels through the engine from left to right. The valve chest for each of the cylinders is to the left of the corresponding cylinder.

History

Early work

1781 – Jonathan Hornblower, the grandson of one of Newcomen's engine erectors in Cornwall, patented a double-cylinder compound reciprocating beam engine in 1781. He was prevented from developing it further by James Watt, who claimed his own patents were infringed.
1797 - Richard Trevithick develops an effective high pressure steam engine.
1804 – Arthur Woolf develops the stationary Woolf high-pressure compound engine, patented in 1805. The Woolf engine lessened the increased magnitude of the continual heating and cooling of a single-expansion high pressure steam engine that leads to inefficiency. It also solved the problem that the contemporary cast iron cylinders could not handle it well.

Double-expansion
1833 – Hercules (1829) was modified to use an extra low pressure cylinder, taken from Agrippina, with steam from her high-pressure cylinders. This modification was designed by Dutch engineer Gerhard Moritz Roentgen, making him the inventor of the naval compound steam engine. The steam paddle tugboat was then successfully used for service on the river Waal, becoming the first ship with a compound steam engine to enter service.
1845 – William McNaught devised a method of fixing an additional high-pressure cylinder within an existing beam engine. To do so involved using a long pipe to connect the cylinders, and an extra set of valves to balance them. In effect this acted as a receiving chest, and a new type of compound had been invented. This system allowed greater control of the steam intake and cut-offs. An engine could be slowed by either a throttle which reduced the pressure of the steam, or by adjusting the cut-off on either cylinder. The latter was more efficient as no power was lost. The cycle was smoother as the two cylinders were not in phase.
1865  –  was launched, equipped with a 300hp compound steam engine. The engine was designed by Alfred Holt, one of her owners. Holt had persuaded the Board of Trade to allow a boiler pressure of 60psi instead of the normal 25psi - a higher pressure was needed to realise the advantages of double-expansion. The efficiency obtained enabled this ship to travel 8,500 miles before coaling. This made her competitive on routes between China and Britain.

Multiple-expansion

1861 – Daniel Adamson took out a patent for a multiple-expansion engine, with three or more cylinders connected to one beam or crankshaft. He built a triple-expansion engine for Victoria Mills, Dukinfield which opened in 1867.
1871 – Charles Normand, of Le Havre fitted a triple-expansion engine to a Seine river boat in 1871.
1872 – Sir Fredrick J. Bramwell reported that compound marine engines, operating at 45psi to 60psi, consumed 2 lbs to 2.5 lbs of coal per hour per indicated horsepower.
1881 – Alexander Carnegie Kirk built SS Aberdeen, the first major ship to be successfully powered by a triple expansion engine.
1887 – HMS Victoria launched, the first battleship to be powered by triple expansion engines.
1891 – Triple expansion compound marine engines, operating at 160psi, consumed on average about 1.5 lbs of coal per hour per indicated horsepower.

Applications

Pumping engines

Mill engines

Though the first mills were driven by water power, once steam engines were adopted the manufacturer no longer needed to site the mills by running water. Cotton spinning required ever larger mills to fulfil the demand, and this drove the owners to demand increasingly powerful engines. When boiler pressure had exceeded 60 psi, compound engines achieved a thermo-dynamic advantage, but it was the mechanical advantages of the smoother stroke that was the deciding factor in the adoption of compounds. In 1859, there was 75,886 ihp (indicated horsepower) of engines in mills in the Manchester area, of which 32,282 ihp was provided by compounds though only 41,189 ihp was generated from boilers operated at over 60psi.

To generalise, between 1860 and 1926 all Lancashire mills were driven by compounds. The last compound built was by Buckley and Taylor for Wye No.2 mill, Shaw. This engine was a cross-compound design to 2,500 ihp, driving a 24 ft, 90 ton flywheel, and operated until 1965.

Marine applications

In the marine environment, the general requirement was for autonomy and increased operating range, as ships had to carry their coal supplies. The old salt-water boiler was thus no longer adequate and had to be replaced by a closed fresh-water circuit with condenser. The result from 1880 onwards was the multiple-expansion engine using three or four expansion stages (triple- and quadruple-expansion engines). These engines used a series of double-acting cylinders of progressively increasing diameter and/or stroke (and hence volume) designed to divide the work into three or four, as appropriate, equal portions for each expansion stage. Where space is at a premium, two smaller cylinders of a large sum volume might be used for the low-pressure stage. Multiple-expansion engines typically had the cylinders arranged in-line, but various other formations were used. In the late 19th century, the Yarrow-Schlick-Tweedy balancing 'system' was used on some marine triple-expansion engines. Y-S-T engines divided the low-pressure expansion stages between two cylinders, one at each end of the engine. This allowed the crankshaft to be better balanced, resulting in a smoother, faster-responding engine which ran with less vibration. This made the 4-cylinder triple-expansion engine popular with large passenger liners (such as the Olympic class), but was ultimately replaced by the virtually vibration-free steam turbine.

The development of this type of engine was important for its use in steamships as by exhausting to a condenser the water could be reclaimed to feed the boiler, which was unable to use seawater. Land-based steam engines could simply exhaust much of their steam, as feed water was usually readily available. Prior to and during World War II, the expansion engine dominated marine applications where high vessel speed was not essential. It was superseded by the steam turbine when speed was required, such as for warships and ocean liners. HMS Dreadnought of 1905 was the first major warship to replace the proven technology of the reciprocating engine with the then-novel steam turbine.

Application to railway locomotives

For railway locomotive applications the main benefit sought from compounding was economy in fuel and water consumption plus high power/weight ratio due to temperature and pressure drop taking place over a longer cycle, this resulting in increased efficiency; additional perceived advantages included more even torque.

While designs for compound locomotives may date as far back as James Samuel's 1856 patent for a "continuous expansion locomotive", the practical history of railway compounding begins with Anatole Mallet's designs in the 1870s. Mallet locomotives were operated in the United States up to the end of mainline steam by the Norfolk and Western Railway. The designs of Alfred George de Glehn in France also saw significant use, especially in the rebuilds of André Chapelon. A wide variety of compound designs were tried around 1900, but most were short-lived in popularity, due to their complexity and maintenance liability. In the 20th century the superheater was widely adopted, and the vast majority of steam locomotives were simple-expansion (with some compound locomotives converted to simple).  It was realised by engineers that locomotives at steady speed were worked most efficiently with a wide-open regulator and early cut-off, the latter being set via the reversing gear.  A locomotive operating at very early cut-off of steam (e.g. at 15% of the piston stroke) allows maximum expansion of the steam, with less wasted energy at the end of the stroke.  Superheating eliminates the condensation and rapid loss of pressure that would otherwise occur with such expansion.

Large American locomotives used two cross-compound steam-driven air compressors, e.g. the Westinghouse 8 1/2" 150-D, for the train brakes.

Notes

See also
 Compound turbine
 Willans engine

References

Bibliography

Further reading

External links 

Northern Mill Engine Society at Bolton Steam Museum

 
Steam engines
Steam locomotive technologies
History of the steam engine

cs:Sdružený parní stroj
de:Verbunddampfmaschine
ja:複式蒸気機関
pl:Silnik sprzężony